Christos Tsakmakis (born 6 September 1987 in Augsburg) is a German-born, Greek slalom canoeist who has competed at the international level since 2002.

He won a bronze medal in the C1 event at the 2007 European Championships in Liptovský Mikuláš.

Competing in three Summer Olympics, he earned his best finish of seventh in the C1 event in Beijing in 2008.

References

External links

1987 births
Canoeists at the 2004 Summer Olympics
Canoeists at the 2008 Summer Olympics
Canoeists at the 2012 Summer Olympics
Citizens of Greece through descent
German people of Greek descent
Sportspeople of Greek descent
Greek male canoeists
Living people
Olympic canoeists of Greece
Sportspeople from Augsburg